A chariot is a two-wheeled, horse-drawn vehicle.

Chariot may also refer to:

Vehicles
 Chariot (carriage), a horse-drawn vehicle for one or two standing riders
 Chariot (China), use of war chariots in China
 Chariot manned torpedo, underwater vehicle used by the Royal Navy in World War II
For similar underwater vehicles, see :Category:Wet subs
 Mitsubishi Chariot, a compact multi-purpose vehicle produced by Mitsubishi Motors
 The "Chariot", a tracked all-terrain vehicle used by the Robinson family in the television series Lost In Space

Music
 Chariot (album), by Gavin DeGraw
 "Chariot" (song), the title track from the album
 Chariot (band), a British heavy metal band from London
 The Chariot (band), a hardcore band from Douglasville, Georgia, United States
 "The Chariot" (song), by The Cat Empire
 "Chariot", a French single by Petula Clark, translated into English as "I Will Follow Him"

Other
 "Chariot", a fictional character from the anime series and video game Black Rock Shooter
 "Chariot", a piece in Xiangqi (Chinese chess)  
 Chariot (Australia), Internet service provider
 Chariot (Chinese constellation), one of the twenty-eight mansions of the Chinese zodiac
 Chariot (company), a San Francisco-based commuter shuttle provider
 "Chariot" (movie), a 2013 movie
 Chariot (film), a 2022 film starring John Malkovich
 Chariot (video game), a 2014 video game
 Chariots Leisure Ltd, operator of a chain of Gay bathhouses in the United Kingdom
 Operation Chariot, the St Nazaire Raid during World War II
 The Chariot (Tarot card), a Major Arcana Tarot card
 "Chariot", a disc golf midrange disc by Infinite Discs
 Chariot (comics), a 2021 comic book series.

See also
Charioteer (disambiguation)
Charlot (name)